Hadahade  is a Village Development Committee Gulmi District in the Lumbini Zone of western tregion Nepal. At the time of the 2001 Nepal census, it had a population of 3323 persons living in 667 individual households. Motikhark is one of the known places the heart of Hadahade.

References

External links
UN map of the municipalities of Gulmi District

Populated places in Gulmi District